Ardoix is a commune in the Ardèche department in the Auvergne-Rhône-Alpes region of southern France.

The inhabitants of the commune are known as Ardoisiens or Ardoisiennes

Geography
Adoix is located some 7 km west by north-west of Saint-Vallier and 14 km south-east of Annonay. Access to the commune is by the D221 road from Sarras in the east passing through the length of the commune and the village and continuing south-west to Saint-Romain-d'Ay. Apart from the village there are the hamlets of Corme, Bruas, Thoue, and Chamas. The commune is a valley between two mountain ranges and apart from the slopes of the mountains is entirely farmland.

The Cance river forms a large part of the northern border of the commune as it flows east to the Rhone river. Many small tributaries of the Cance rise in the commune including the Ruisseau de la Goueille which forms the north-western border. The Ay river forms the southern border of the commune and also flows east to the Rhone.

Neighbouring communes and villages

History
In the gift of Quintenas made by Charlemagne to the Benedictine Abbey of Saint-Claude on 23 August 776, the Church of Saint-Didier d'Ardoix was mentioned. Also dependent on Saint Claude were the Chapel of Oriol, Saint-Alban-d'Ay, Saint-Jeure-d'Ay, Saint-Romain-d'Ay, and the chapel of Our Lady of Ay. In 1557 Ardoix, as was Quintenas, were secularized and thereafter administered by the Diocese of Vienne.

The old land of Ardoix had its chateaux and towers. Oriol, Munat, Manoha, Léorat, and le Pestrin 
Manoha was a fortified house and farm in medieval times. It is still a rural area today. 
The tower of Oriol is all that remains of the medieval castle which overlooked the gorges of the Ay. During the Hundred Years War it was sacked by soldiers. Taking advantage of the wars of religion, a criminal from Vernoux, Erard, took it and restored it to make it his lair. Farmers, frustrated by his robberies destroyed the castle to dislodge the bandit (who was hanged at Lamastre).

Administration

List of Successive Mayors

Demography
In 2017 the commune had 1,262 inhabitants.

Distribution of Age Groups
The population of the town is younger than the departmental average.

Percentage Distribution of Age Groups in Ardoix and Ardèche Department in 2017

Source: INSEE

Sites and Monuments

The Tower of Oriol
The Chateau of Manoha
The Chateau of Muñás
The Oratory of Our Lady of Cormes
The Church contains many items which are registered as historical objects:
The Rostrum Balustrade (19th century)
A Baptismal font (19th century)
2 Confessionals (19th century)
A Crucifix (19th century)
A Pulpit with supports (19th century)
A Stations of the Cross (19th century)
4 Statues and Commemorative Plaques (19th century)
Decor of the Chapel of the Virgin
Decor of the Chapel of the Sacred Heart

Ardoix Picture Gallery

See also
Communes of the Ardèche department

References

External links
Ardoix official website 
Val d'Ay Tourism website
Ardoix on the National Geographic Institute website 
Ardoix on Géoportail, National Geographic Institute (IGN) website 
Ardoix on the 1750 Cassini Map

Communes of Ardèche